The following is a list of awards and nominations received by American actress Sigourney Weaver. She won the Golden Globe Award for Best Supporting Actress for the film Working Girl (1988), the Golden Globe Award for Best Actress (drama) for the film Gorillas in the Mist (1988), and the BAFTA Award for Best Actress in a Supporting Role for the film The Ice Storm (1997). She is one of 12 actors in Academy Award history to receive two acting nominations in the same year. Weaver has also received a Grammy Award for Best Spoken Word Album and is a three-time Academy Award nominee, four-time Emmy Award nominee and a Tony Award nominee.

Film and television

Academy Awards
The Academy Awards (Oscars) are presented by the American Academy of Motion Picture Arts and Sciences (AMPAS)

BAFTA Awards
The British Academy Film Awards are presented by the British Academy of Film and Television Arts.

Note: Working Girl was released in the United Kingdom in 1989 (1988 in US)

Critics' Choice Awards

Golden Globe Awards
The Golden Globe Awards are presented by the Hollywood Foreign Press Association.

Goya Awards

Primetime Emmy Awards
The Emmy Awards are presented by the American Academy of Television Arts & Sciences.

Saturn Awards
The Saturn Awards are presented by the Academy of Science Fiction, Fantasy and Horror Films.

Screen Actors Guild Awards
The Screen Actors Guild Awards (SAG Awards) are presented by the Screen Actors Guild-American Federation of Television and Radio Artists (SAG-AFTRA).

Theatre

Tony Awards
The Antoinette Perry Award (Tony) is presented by the American Theatre Wing and The Broadway League.

Drama Desk Awards
The Drama Desk Awards are presented by the Drama Desk Organisation.

Other Awards

Grammy Awards

Special awards

References

Lists of awards received by American actor
Weaver, Sigourney